William Minor is the name of:
 William Chester Minor (1834–1920), American surgeon, prolific contributor to the Oxford English Dictionary
William J. Minor (1808–1869), American planter and banker in the Antebellum South
 William T. Minor (1815–1889), American politician
 William Minor (New York City), New York assemblyman
 William Minor (poet), American minimalist poet